Sydney Mines (Scottish Gaelic: Mèinnean Shidni) is a community and former town in Canada's Nova Scotia's Cape Breton Regional Municipality.

Founded in 1784 and incorporated as a town in 1889, Sydney Mines has a rich history in coal production, although mining activity has now ceased. Prior to a permanent settlement being established, there was significant activity along the shore. Upon the success of coal mining operations, the Nova Scotia Steel and Coal Company constructed a steel plant in Sydney Mines in 1902. The plant, alongside the steel plant in Sydney owned by the Dominion Iron and Steel Company combined to produce more than 50% of Canada's steel during World War 1. The plant was later sold to the British Empire Steel Corporation and ceased operations years later.

History

During the American Revolution, the British used the coal mines of Sydney Mines to supply the British loyalists in Boston and Halifax.  American and French ships made great efforts to interrupt this vital supply line.  On November 1, 1776, John Paul Jones - the father of the American Navy - set sail in command of Alfred to free hundreds of American prisoners working in the area's coal mines. Although winter conditions prevented the freeing of the prisoners, the mission did result in the capture of Mellish, a vessel carrying a vital supply of winter clothing intended for John Burgoyne's troops in Canada.

Major Timothy Hierlihy and his regiment on board HMS Hope worked in and protected from privateer attacks on the coal mines at Sydney Cape Breton. Sydney Cape Breton provided a vital supply of coal for Halifax throughout the war.  The British began developing the mining site at Sydney Mines in 1777.  On 14 May 1778, Major Hierlihy arrived at Cape Breton.  While there, Hierlihy reported that he “beat off many piratical attacks, killed some and took other prisoners.”

A few years into the war there was also a naval engagement between French ships and a British convoy off Sydney, Nova Scotia, near Spanish River (1781), Cape Breton. Six French sailors were killed and 17 British, with many more wounded.

Sydney Mines lies immediately northeast of North Sydney and faces Sydney across Sydney Harbour. Sydney Mines was once a major coal-producing community. Mining began locally in 1766, and in 1830 systematic operations were undertaken. One of the area mines extended about 5 miles (8 km) out under the sea. The last mine was closed in 1975.

Sydney Mines is on the northern side of Sydney Harbor, near the mouth. It was earlier known as the Mines due to the coal mines abundant nearby. Although mining has been carried on since 1724, the first shaft for the General Mining Association in Sydney Mines was sunk in 1830. Manufacturing enterprises included corrugated steel culverts and the British Canadian Co-operative Society Limited, operating a dairy and a bakery.

Sydney Mines was the filming location for the 1981 horror movie My Bloody Valentine.

Climate
Sydney Mines experiences cool summers. The summer can be very cool at times due to the fact Sydney Mines borders the cool North Atlantic Ocean. Day time highs rarely exceed 20 degrees Celsius. During Summer nights temperatures can become very cold with the average lows being around 10 degrees Celsius, although cold winds can make it seem much colder.

Sydney Mines experiences cold, windy, wet, snowy and very stormy winters. Although low in latitude compared to the rest of Canada and bordering the ocean. Sydney Mines borders the very cold Labrador ocean current. This causes for a cold and very snowy winter. Daytime highs during the winter usually stick around minus 2 degrees Celsius but the fact Sydney Mines lies around the polar jet stream causes it to experience arctic outbreaks and very warm thaws. Sydney Mines, much like the rest of Atlantic Canada, is one of the warmest areas in Canada during the winter but they receives the most snowstorms in Canada. Cold arctic temperatures meet up with the warm Gulf Stream and form one of the most powerful storms in the world. Many people who live in Eastern Canada know the term Nor'easter, which can dump huge amounts of snow to Sydney Mines and the rest of Atlantic Canada.

Education
Sydney Mines has one elementary school, Jubilee Elementary (home to the Johnny Miles Gym), one middle school, Sydney Mines Middle School, one high school, Memorial Composite High School.

Landmarks
In front of Jubilee Elementary on Main Street, there is a bronze statue of Johnny Miles in a running pose. There is a script on it with a small quote and the dates Johnny Miles won the Boston Marathon.

In front of the John J. Nugent Firemen's Centre on Elliot Street (across from the fire station), there is a firefighter statue which represents all the past fire chiefs of the Sydney Mines Volunteer Fire Department.

Notes

References 

Communities in the Cape Breton Regional Municipality
Former towns in Nova Scotia
Mining communities in Nova Scotia
Populated places disestablished in 1995